'Mujhay Roothnay Na Daina' is a Hum TV drama which started airing on 5 September 2011.

Cast
 Rubina Ashraf as Nafeesa
 Komal Rizvi as Rabia
 Bebrak Shah
 Hina Khawaja Bayat
 Junaid Khan
 Zeba Ali as Huma
 Aiman Tariq as Sofia
 Tariq Bukhari
 Noor Hassan Rizvi
 Ismat Zaidi
 Azra Mohyeddin as Ammi
 Akbar Islam
 Sana Dawar
 Asma Jahangir
 Ishtiaq Hussain
 LNoshaba Javed
 Zubair Zakriya
 Lateef Khan

References

2011 Pakistani television series debuts
Pakistani drama television series
Urdu-language television shows
Hum TV original programming
2012 Pakistani television series endings